The Parliament (Joint Departments) Act 2007 (c 16) is an Act of the Parliament of the United Kingdom. The Act authorises the Corporate Officer of the House of Commons and the Corporate Officer of the House of Lords to establish, divide, amalgamate or abolish joint departments of the Houses of Parliament.

See also
Parliament Act (disambiguation)

References
Halsbury's Statutes,

External links
The Parliament (Joint Departments) Act 2007, as amended from the National Archives.
The Parliament (Joint Departments) Act 2007, as originally enacted from the National Archives.
Explanatory notes to the Parliament (Joint Departments) Act 2007.

United Kingdom Acts of Parliament 2007